Junqueirópolis is the name of a city and the surrounding municipality in the western region of the state of São Paulo, Brazil. The population is 20,831 (2020 est.) in an area of 583 km2 (5 km2 of which is city). Its elevation is 421 m. Rio do Peixe (Fish River) and Rio Aguapeí (Aguapeí River) are major rivers of the region.

The municipality contains 16.5% of the  Aguapeí State Park, created in 1998.

History
At the start of the 20th century this area was largely unexplored and undeveloped.  It was not until 1941 that the Companhia Paulista de Estrada de Ferro (São Paulo Locomotive Company) ran railroad tracks through this remote hinterland.

Over the next few years Alvaro de Oliveira Junqueira, a wealthy inhabitant of the city of São Paulo, began buying up land here upon which he established coffee plantations.  On 1 November 1944 the municipal division of Patrimônio de Junqueira (Junqueira's Patrimony) was established and land development proceeded as lots were sold to investors. 

Horácio Cajado de Oliveira, Enrique Coutinho and Jose Amatruda were among those that settled here during this period.  Another early settler was Torataro Takitami, a representative of the country's growing Japanese Brazilian population.

Junqueirópolis was officially founded on 14 June 1949.  The place name has been formed by joining Junqueira's surname with the Greek language-derived suffix -polis meaning "city".

Agriculture

Outside the urban area, Junqueirópolis is a hilly,  agricultural region that produces valuable crops that thrive in a subtropical climate.  For this reason the municipality promotes itself as Cidade Verde, "Green City".

Among the fruits grown here, acerola is important enough to the local economy that Junqueirópolis has another nickname -- Capital da Acerola, the "Acerola Capital".  In the 1998–1999 season Junqueirópolis produced 2,450 tons of this fruit.  The predominant type of acerola produced here is the "Olivier", a variety that is packed with the Vitamin C (1.200 mg/100ml of juice and 1.400 mg/100g of pulp) for which this plant is primarily cultivated and can be cultivated with little pesticide.

Junqueirópolis is also known for its grapes.  Among the most widely cultivated varieties of grape in Junqueirópolis are Itália, Benitaka, Brazil and Ruby.  Grapes from this region are made into table wines of excellent quality.

Other major crops grown in Junqueirópolis are maize, cotton, and coffee.  The importance of produce production to this region is demonstrated in the depiction of the municipal coat of arms shown above which has been illustrated with acerola, grapes, sugarcane, etc.

Penitentiary
The penitentiary in Junqueirópolis was the site of some of the violence of 2006 that swept the prisons of São Paulo state and involved deadly clashes between Primeiro Comando da Capital (a prison gang) and Polícia Militar do Estado de São Paulo (the state police).

References

Municipalities in São Paulo (state)
Populated places established in 1944